The 2009–10 Liga Leumit was the 11th season since it became the second-tier in 1999 and the 68th season of second-tier football in Israel. It began on 21 August 2009 and ended on 15 May 2010.

Changes from 2008–09 season

Structure changes
League size has been increased from twelve to sixteen teams for this season, teams will thus play a home-and-away round-robin schedule for a total of 30 matches.

After the conclusion of this "regular season", teams will be split up into three playoff groups according to their league position. Points earned during the season will be halved and taken over to the respective playoff group. The best six teams will compete for the promotion spots. Clubs ranked 7th through 10th will engage in a placement round, while the bottom six teams will play out two relegation spots.

Team changes

Maccabi Kiryat Ata were directly relegated to the 2009–10 Liga Alef after finishing the 2008–09 season in last place.

Due to the increase in the number of teams, seven teams were directly promoted from the 2008–09 Liga Artzit. These were champions Sektzia Nes Tziona, runners-up Hapoel Ashkelon, third-placed Hapoel Marmorek, fourth-placed Hapoel Rishon LeZion, fifth-placed Ironi Bat Yam, sixth-placed Beitar Shimshon Tel Aviv and seventh-placed Hapoel Nazareth Illit.

In addition, five teams were directly promoted from the 2008–09 Liga Leumit to the 2009–10 Israeli Premier League. These were champions Hapoel Haifa, runners-up Hapoel Acre, third-placed Hapoel Be'er Sheva, fourth-placed Hapoel Ramat Gan and fifth-placed Hapoel Ra'anana.

Overview

Stadia and locations

Regular season

Regular season table

Regular season results

Playoffs
Key numbers for pairing determination (number marks position after 30 games):

Top Playoff
The points obtained during the regular season were halved (and rounded up) before the start of the playoff. Thus, Ironi Kiryat Shmona started with 31 points, Hapoel Kfar Saba with 26, Sektzia Nes Tziona with 24, Ironi Ramat HaSharon with 23, Ironi Bat Yam with 23 and Hapoel Ashkelon started with 22.

Top Playoff table

Top Playoff results

Middle Playoff
The points obtained during the regular season were halved (and rounded up) before the start of the playoff. Thus, Hapoel Nazareth Illit started with 22 points, Ahva Arraba with 22, Hapoel Rishon LeZion with 20 and Maccabi Herzliya started with 20.

Middle Playoff table

Middle Playoff results

Bottom Playoff
The points obtained during the regular season were halved (and rounded up) before the start of the playoff. Thus, Hapoel Bnei Lod started with 20 points, Hakoah Ramat Gan with 19, Maccabi Be'er Sheva with 18, Beitar Shimshon Tel Aviv with 17, Hapoel Jerusalem with 12 and Hapoel Marmorek started with 7.

Bottom Playoff table

Bottom Playoff results

Promotion/relegation playoff

Promotion playoff
The 3rd-placed team Hapoel Kfar Saba faced the 14th-placed Israeli Premier League team Hapoel Ramat Gan. The winner Hapoel Ramat Gan earned a spot in the 2010–11 Israeli Premier League. The match took place on 22 May 2010.

Relegation playoff
The 14th-placed team Maccabi Be'er Sheva faced the Liga Alef promotion playoff winner Maccabi HaShikma Ramat Hen. The winner Maccabi Be'er Sheva earned a spot in the 2010–11 Liga Leumit. The match took place on 31 May 2010.

Season statistics

Scoring
First goal of the season: Ofir Azu for Maccabi Be'er Sheva against Hapoel Kfar Saba, 6th minute (21 August 2009)
Widest winning margin: 5 goals – 
Ironi Ramat HaSharon 5–0 Hapoel Marmorek (21 August 2009)
Maccabi Be'er Sheva 5–0 Hapoel Jerusalem (25 September 2009)
Hapoel Ashkelon 6–1 Hapoel Jerusalem (29 January 2010)
Hapoel Ashkelon 5–0 Beitar Shimshon Tel Aviv (3 April 2010)
Sektzia Nes Tziona 5–0 Hapoel Ashkelon (14 May 2010)
Most goals in a match: 7 goals –
Hapoel Ashkelon 6–1 Hapoel Jerusalem (29 January 2010)
Hapoel Kfar Saba 5–2 Ironi Bat Yam (16 April 2010)
Ironi Bat Yam 4–3 Sektzia Nes Tziona (23 April 2010)

Discipline
First yellow card of the season: Oren Nisim for Ironi Ramat HaSharon against Hakoah Ramat Gan, 33rd minute (21 August 2009)
First red card of the season: Aimé Lavie for Hakoah Ramat Gan against Ironi Ramat HaSharon, 90th minute (21 August 2009)

Miscellaneous
First drawn match: Maccabi Herzliya 0–0 Sektzia Nes Tziona (22 August 2009)
First goalless match: Maccabi Herzliya 0–0 Sektzia Nes Tziona (22 August 2009)

Top scorers

See also
 2009–10 Israel State Cup
 2009–10 Toto Cup Leumit
 List of 2009–10 Israeli football summer transfers
 List of 2009–10 Israeli football winter transfers

References

Liga Leumit seasons
Israel
2009–10 in Israeli football leagues